Yves P. Pelletier (born January 15, 1961) (also credited as Yves Pelletier) is a Canadian film director, actor and comedian.

Born  in Laval, Quebec, Pelletier first began to work for the comedy troupe "Rock et Belles Oreilles" (R.B.O.) from their debut in 1981 up to the group's separation in 1995. He is well known for his Monsieur Caron and Stromgol characters in the series, and for the use of absurd humour. He has also made appearances in the following Quebec films:
Ding et Dong, le film - 1990
Letters of Transit (Les Sauf-conduits) - 1991
Karmina - 1996
Karmina 2 - 2001
Happy Camper (Camping Sauvage) - 2004
Le cas Roberge - 2008
The Bossé Empire (L'Empire Bo$$é) 2012

He appeared from time to time on the television series Un gars, une fille as Guy's friend named Yves. He also appeared in film adaptations of the Rock et Belles Oreilles series.

He made his debut as a movie director with his 2004 film Love and Magnets (Les Aimants) and released his second feature, Le Baiser du Barbu in June 2010.

Yves Pelletier wrote two comic books:
 Valentin, art by Pascal Girard, La Pastèque, 2010, 
 Le pouvoir de l'amour et autres vaines romances, art by Iris, La Pastèque, 2014,

Notes and references

External links
 

1961 births
Canadian male film actors
Canadian sketch comedians
Comedians from Quebec
Film directors from Quebec
French Quebecers
Living people
Male actors from Quebec
People from Laval, Quebec